Una noche (One Night) is a 2012 Cuban-set drama-thriller film written and directed by Lucy Mulloy and starring Dariel Arrechada, Anailín de la Rúa de la Torre, and Javier Nuñez Florián.

Plot
Trapped in desperate poverty in Havana, Raúl dreams of escaping to Miami. When accused of assaulting a tourist, he sees his only option as to flee. He begs his best friend, Elio, to abandon everything, including his family, and help him reach Miami, 90 miles across the ocean. Elio's commitment is tested when he is torn between helping Raúl escape and protecting his twin sister, Lila. The three leave on a raft which Elio made of tires. Sharks are attracted by Lila's menstrual blood seeping into the water. Elio dies when trying to rescue Lila. Raúl and Lila end up adrift, clinging to a styrofoam board, and are pulled to the Cuban shore by British tourists with their jet skis.

Production
Mulloy spent years in Havana researching for her first feature Una noche. Whilst in Cuba Mulloy's story developed as she searched for young untrained talent to take the lead roles. Mulloy received a production grant and mentorship from Spike Lee.

Real-life defection
While in Miami to promote the film in 2012, actors Anailín de la Rúa de la Torre (Lila) and Javier Nuñez Florián (Elio) disappeared. When they made contact, they indicated they were defecting, requesting political asylum.

Reception

Una noche world premiered at the 2012 Berlin International Film Festival in the Generation Competition and had its US premier at the 2012 Tribeca Film Festival. "A pulsing debut feature has an undercurrent of ribald comedy that doesn't entirely prepare the viewer for the harrowing turn it takes."

Una noche shot to international media attention, ahead of its US premiere when two of the film's lead actors, Javier Nuñez Florián and Anailín de la Rúa de la Torre, on their way to present the film at its US premier in Tribeca Film Festival, disappeared, reportedly defecting to the US.

In a highly publicized twist Javier Nuñez Florián and his co-star Dariel Arrechada went on to win the Best Actor Award with Nuñez remaining in hiding during the ensuing media frenzy. "Una Noche cleaned up at Tribeca Film Festival in juried awards, taking home best actor, cinematography, and new director honors in the Narrative competition."

Accolades
In 2010, with Una noche in full production, Mulloy was awarded the Creative Promise Emerging Narrative Award at Tribeca Film Festival. In January 2010 Una noche won the Spike Lee Production Grant Award for film production. Winner 2010 Adrienne Shelly Foundation IFP Director's Grant. Winner 2011 Gotham Award Euphoria Calvin Klein Spotlight on Women Filmmakers’ ‘Live The Dream’ post production grant. Una noche was at the 2012 Berlin International Film Festival.

In the United States, Una noche premiered at the Tribeca Film Festival and went on to win:
Tribeca Film Festival Award for Best Director of a Feature Film - Lucy Mulloy
Tribeca Film Festival Award for Best Actor in a Feature Film - shared between Javier Nuñez Florian and his co-star Dariel Arrechada 
Tribeca Film Festival Award for Best Cinematography of a Feature Film - shared between Shlomo Godder and Trevor Forrest
Gotham Award Spotlight Award For Women Filmmakers Una noche
Berlin Film Festival, Nominated for Crystal Bear - Lucy Mulloy
Berlin Film Festival Nominated for Cinema Fairbindet prize 
Berlin Film Festival Finalist for Teddy Award
Brasilia International Film Festival Best Script Una noche
Deauville American Film Festival Grand Jury Prize Una noche
Athens International Film Festival Best Script Una noche
Fort Lauderdale International Film Festival Best Foreign Film shared between Lucy Mulloy, Sandy Pérez Aguila, Maite Artieda, Daniel Mulloy, Yunior Santiago Una noche
Fort Lauderdale International Film Festival Best Director Una noche 
Stockholm International Film Festival Telia Award Una noche 
International Film Festival of India Special Jury Prize Una noche
Oaxaca Film Festival Best Actor, Javier Nuñez Florian Una noche
Independent Spirit Awards Best First Feature Nomination, shared between Lucy Mulloy, Sandy Pérez Aguila, Maite Artieda, Daniel Mulloy, Yunior Santiago Una noche
Independent Spirit Awards Best Editor Nomination, Cindy Lee Una noche

References

External links
 
 

2012 films
American independent films
American LGBT-related films
2010s Spanish-language films
LGBT-related films based on actual events
Films about illegal immigration to the United States
Films set in Havana
Media Wave Award winners
2012 thriller drama films
Cuban drama films
2012 drama films
2012 independent films
2010s American films